Hodonín Zoo is a zoo, located on the northwestern outskirts of Hodonín in the South Moravian Region of the Czech Republic.

History
Hodonín Zoo was created on the initiative of the former City National Committee, chaired by Emil Schwarz. Founded in 1976, the zoo was partly open to but officially opened on 29 September 1977.

On 24 June 2021, Hodonín Zoo was severely impacted by the F4 2021 South Moravia tornado.

External links

References

Zoos in the Czech Republic
Hodonín
Buildings and structures in the South Moravian Region
1977 establishments in Czechoslovakia
Zoos established in 1977
20th-century architecture in the Czech Republic